Sun Dawen, known as Da-Wen Sun, is a Chinese-born professor who studies food engineering at University College Dublin.

Professor Sun is an Academician of six academies including Royal Irish Academy, Academia Europaea (The Academy of Europe), Polish Academy of Sciences, International Academy of Food Science and Technology, International Academy of Agricultural and Biosystems Engineering and International Academy of Refrigeration. He is also President of International Commission of Agricultural and Biosystems Engineering (CIGR).

Biography 
Sun was born in Chaozhou, Guangdong, China. He received a first class BSc Honours and MSc in Mechanical Engineering, and a PhD in Chemical Engineering in China.  He was appointed College Lecturer at National University of Ireland, Dublin (University College Dublin) in 1995, and was then Senior Lecturer, Associate Professor and full Professor. Sun is now Professor and Director of the Food Refrigeration and Computerised Food Technology Research Group in University College Dublin.

He is Editor-in-Chief of Food and Bioprocess Technology – an International Journal (Springer), Series Editor of Contemporary Food Engineering book series (CRC Press / Taylor & Francis), former Editor of Journal of Food Engineering (Elsevier), and editorial board member for a number of international journals. He is also a Chartered Engineer.

Academic career 
Sun's academic work is in the area of food engineering research and education. His main research activities include cooling, drying and refrigeration processes and systems, quality and safety of food products, bioprocess simulation and optimisation, and computer vision technology. He has studied on vacuum cooling of cooked meats, pizza quality inspection by computer vision, and edible films for shelf-life extension of fruit and vegetables.

He is the most cited author of several food science journals such as Lebensmittel-Wissenschaft & Technologie, Journal of Food Engineering, Trends in Food Science and Technology, Food and Bioprocess Technology, and Innovative Food Science and Emerging Technologies.

Honours and awards 
Sun has also received numerous awards, which include
 Honorary Doctorate Degree from the Universidad Privada del Norte (UPN) in Peru, 2018
 Full Member (Academician) of International Academy of Refrigeration, 2018
 Fellow of International Academy of Agricultural and Biosystems Engineering (iAABE), 2016
 Fellow of International Academy of Food Science and Technology, 2012
 Foreign Member of Polish Academy of Sciences, 2017
 Member of Academia Europaea (The Academy of Europe), 2011
 Member of Royal Irish Academy, 2010
 CIGR Fellow Award, 2010, by CIGR (International Commission of Agricultural and Biosystems Engineering – formerly International Commission of Agricultural Engineering)
 Fellow of Institution of Engineers of Ireland (Engineers Ireland), 2009
 CIGR Recognition Award, 2008, by CIGR (International Commission of Agricultural Engineering)
 AFST(I) Fellow Award, 2007, by Association of Food Scientists and Technologists (India)
 CIGR Merit Award, 2006, by CIGR (International Commission of Agricultural Engineering)
 Food Engineer of the Year Award, 2004, by The Institution of Mechanical Engineers, UK
 CIGR Merit Award, 2000, by CIGR (International Commission of Agricultural Engineering)

References

External links 
 Professor Da-Wen Sun
 UCD Food Refrigeration & Computerised Food Technology
 Complete List of Publications by Da-Wen Sun
 List of News about Da-Wen Sun

Living people
Academic journal editors
Academics of University College Dublin
Agriculture educators
Chinese bioengineers
Educators from Guangdong
Chinese diaspora
Engineers from Guangdong
Chinese food scientists
Chaoshanese people
Food engineers
Irish people of Chinese descent
Members of Academia Europaea
Members of the Royal Irish Academy
Writers from Chaozhou
Biologists from Guangdong
Year of birth missing (living people)
Chinese science writers